Dimitrios Bougas (born 13 March 1971) is a retired Greek football midfielder.

Honours
Panionios
 Greek Cup: 1997–98

References

1971 births
Living people
Ethnikos Piraeus F.C. players
Panionios F.C. players
Trikala F.C. players
Kallithea F.C. players
AO Chania F.C. players
Agios Dimitrios F.C. players
Super League Greece players
Association football midfielders
Footballers from Athens
Greek footballers